Seaview is a small Canadian coastal community located in the western part of Saint John County, New Brunswick.

It is located within the boundaries of the city of Saint John.

Notable people

See also
List of neighbourhoods in New Brunswick

References
 
 Geographical Names of Canada - Seaview

Neighbourhoods in Saint John, New Brunswick